Bairwa is the Ethnic group of Chamar Subcaste of Scheduled Caste of India's Positive System of Discrimination. Bairwa means the peoples who live  without enmity.

References

Ethnic groups in India